Nečas (masculine),  Nečasová (feminine) is a Czech surname. Simplified form Necas. It may refer to:

 Jakub Nečas (born 1995), Czech footballer
 Jan Nečas (born 1977), Czech footballer
 Jaromír Nečas (1888–1945), Czech politician
 Martin Nečas (born 1999), Czech ice hockey player
 Otto Necas, Austrian footballer
 Petr Nečas (born 1964), Czech politician and former Prime Minister
 Radim Nečas (born 1969), Czech footballer
 Radim Nečas (footballer born 1988), Czech footballer
 Jana Nečasová (born 1964), former Czech politician and high civil servant

See also
Manuel Sousa a.k.a. Necas
 
 

Czech-language surnames